Events from the year 1914 in Ireland.

Events
17 January – Edward Carson inspects a parade of the East Belfast Regiment of the Ulster Volunteers.
20 February – the Fethard-on-Sea life-boat capsizes on service off the County Wexford coast: nine crew are lost.
26 February – , designed as the third and largest , is launched at the Harland & Wolff shipyards in Belfast.
1 March – three outbreaks of foot and mouth disease are confirmed in County Cork.
9 March – the British Prime Minister proposes to allow the Ulster counties to hold a vote on whether or not to join a Home Rule parliament in Dublin.
20 March – Curragh incident: British Army officers stationed at the Curragh Camp resign their commissions rather than be ordered to resist action by Unionist Ulster Volunteers if the Home Rule Bill is passed. The government backs down and they are reinstated.
2 April – Cumann na mBan, the Irish republican women's paramilitary organisation, is formed in Dublin as an auxiliary of the Irish Volunteers.
6 April – the second reading of the Home Rule Bill is carried in Westminster.
24–25 April – Larne Gun Running: 35,000 rifles and over 3 million rounds of ammunition from Germany are landed at Larne, Bangor, and Donaghadee for the Ulster Volunteers and quickly distributed around Ulster by motor transport.
25 May – the House of Commons of the United Kingdom passes the Irish Home Rule Bill.
23 June–14 July – the Government of Ireland Bill passes through the House of Lords. It allows Ulster counties to vote on whether or not they want to come under Dublin's jurisdiction. The wishes of Fermanagh and Tyrone are eventually ignored.
10 July – the Provisional Government of Ulster meets for the first time in the Ulster Hall. It vows to keep Ulster in trust for the King and the British constitution.
21 July – a conference (called on 19 July) is opened at Buckingham Palace by the King. It is hoped that unionists and nationalists attending will break the impasse over Home Rule.
24 July – the Buckingham Palace conference ends in failure. Nationalists and Unionists present cannot agree in principle or detail.
26 July – Howth gun-running: Erskine Childers and his wife Molly sail into Howth in his yacht  and land 2,500 guns for the Irish Volunteers. Troops returning to Dublin, having been called out to assist police in attempting to prevent the Volunteers from moving the arms to the city, fire on a crowd of protestors at Bachelors Walk, killing three; a fourth man dies later from bayonet wounds.
4 August – World War I: Declaration of war by the United Kingdom on the German Empire.
September – Ulster Division formed as a division of the British New Army from Ulster Volunteers.
18 September – the Government of Ireland Act (the Home Rule Act) receives Royal Assent (although George V has contemplated refusing it) but is postponed (as projected on 30 July) for the duration of World War I by the simultaneous Suspensory Act and in practice never comes into effect in its original form.
20 September – in a speech at Woodenbridge, County Wicklow, John Redmond calls on members of the Irish Volunteers to go "wherever the firing line extends". The majority do so, fighting in the 10th and  16th (Irish) Division alongside their volunteer counterparts from the 36th (Ulster) Division; the rump Irish Volunteers split off on 24 September.
2 October – German spy Carl Hans Lody is arrested at the Great Southern Hotel, Killarney.
18 October – the British Royal Navy's Grand Fleet takes shelter in Lough Swilly while Scapa Flow is secured against submarine attack.
27 October – World War I: Royal Navy super-dreadnought battleship  (23,400 tons), is sunk off Tory Island, north-west of Ireland, by a minefield laid by the armed German merchant-cruiser Berlin.
5 December – the Irish Volunteers appoint a headquarters staff, with Eoin MacNeill as chief of staff.
Welsh evangelist George Jeffreys establishes his first church in Belfast, predecessor of the Elim Pentecostal Church.

Arts and literature
February
James Joyce's semi-autobiographical novel A Portrait of the Artist as a Young Man commences serialization in The Egoist (London).
Lord Dunsany's collection Five Plays is published in London.
4 February – a staging of George A. Birmingham's comedy General John Regan at Westport Town Hall provokes a riot.
June – James Joyce's Dubliners, a collection of fifteen short stories depicting the Irish middle classes in and around Dublin during the early 20th century, is published in London.
Terence MacSwiney's contemporary play The Revolutionist is published (first performed 1921).

Sports

Football
International
Ireland win the British Home Championship football tournament outright for the first time.
19 January  Wales 1–2 Ireland (in Wrexham)
14 February  England 0–3 Ireland (in Middlesbrough)
14 March  Ireland 1–1 Scotland (in Belfast)
Irish League
Winners: Linfield
Irish Cup
Winners: Glentoran 3–1 Linfield

Golf
Balmoral Golf Club opened in Belfast.

Births
15 January – James Flanagan (in Derry), only Roman Catholic Chief Constable of the Royal Ulster Constabulary (died 1999).
18 January – Patrick Lindsay, Fine Gael TD and lawyer (died 1993).
23 February – Sheila Galvin, Fianna Fáil TD (died 1983).
10 March – Michael Torrens-Spence, held commissions in the Royal Navy Fleet Air Arm, the Royal Air Force, the British Army, Ulster Special Constabulary and Ulster Defence Regiment (died 2001).
30 March – Eamon Kelly, actor (died 2001).
28 May – William Blease, Baron Blease, trade unionist and politician (died 2008).
19 June – Julia Clifford, fiddle player and traditional musician (died 1997).
1 July – John Feenan, footballer (died 1994) 
10 July – Charles Donnelly, poet, killed at the Jarama Front, Spanish Civil War (died 1937).
30 July – Michael Morris, 3rd Baron Killanin, journalist, author, sports official and sixth president of the International Olympic Committee (died 1999).
5 August – Charles Cuffe, cricketer (died 1972).
10 September – Terence O'Neill, Fourth Prime Minister of Northern Ireland (died 1990).
13 September – Michael F. Kitt, Fianna Fáil TD (died 1974).
8 November – Jackie Brown, footballer (died 1990).
14 November – Joseph Barnes, medical missionary (died 2017).
10 December – Séamus Dolan, Cathaoirleach of Seanad Éireann 1977–1981 (died 2010).
31 December – Ernest Gébler, writer (died 1998).
Full date unknown
Aidan MacCarthy, doctor, RAF medical officer, captured by the Japanese during the Second World War (died 1992).
Eddie McAteer, Nationalist Party (Northern Ireland) MP (died 1986).
Sydney Sparkes Orr, Professor of Philosophy at the University of Tasmania (died 1966).

Deaths
7 January – Patrick Weston Joyce, historian and musicologist (born 1827).
23 February – Thomas McCarthy Fennell, Fenian political prisoner transported to Western Australia (born 1841).
4 March – William Hamilton, cricketer (born 1859).
25 March – Robert James McMordie, solicitor, politician and Lord Mayor of Belfast (born 1849).
31 March – Timothy Daniel Sullivan, journalist, politician and poet, wrote the Irish national hymn God Save Ireland (born 1827).
19 May – Frederick James Walker, motor cycle racer, killed at 1914 Isle of Man TT races (born 1876).
23 June – Colonel John Burke, soldier in America (born 1838).
28 June – Patrick James Foley, politician (born 1836) 
12 August – John Philip Holland, engineer, developed the first Royal Navy submarine (born 1840).
1 September – George Henry Morris, soldier, first commanding officer to lead an Irish Guards battalion into battle, killed in action (born 1872).
15 October – Anthony Traill, provost of Trinity College Dublin (born 1838).
2 November – Charles FitzClarence, soldier, recipient of the Victoria Cross for gallantry in 1899 near Mafeking, killed in action (born 1865).
10 November – Lydia Shackleton, botanical artist (born 1828).
22 December – John Nesbitt Kirchhoffer, lawyer and politician in Canada (born 1848).
26 December – Thomas Kelly-Kenny, British Army general who served in the Second Boer War (born 1840).

References

 
1910s in Ireland
Ireland
Years of the 20th century in Ireland
Ireland